The 2020–21 season was the 121st season in the existence of Eintracht Frankfurt and the club's ninth consecutive season in the top flight of German football. In addition to the domestic league, Eintracht Frankfurt participated in this season's edition of the DFB-Pokal. The season covered the period from 7 August 2020 to 30 June 2021.

Players

First-team squad

Players out on loan

Transfers

In

Out

Pre-season and friendlies

Competitions

Overview

Bundesliga

League table

Results summary

Results by round

Matches
The league fixtures were announced on 7 August 2020.

DFB-Pokal

Statistics

Appearances and goals

|-
! colspan=14 style=background:#dcdcdc; text-align:center| Goalkeepers

|-
! colspan=14 style=background:#dcdcdc; text-align:center| Defenders

|-
! colspan=14 style=background:#dcdcdc; text-align:center| Midfielders

|-
! colspan=14 style=background:#dcdcdc; text-align:center| Forwards

|-
! colspan=14 style=background:#dcdcdc; text-align:center| Players transferred out during the season

Goalscorers

Clean sheets

Disciplinary record

Notes

References

External links

Eintracht Frankfurt seasons
Eintracht Frankfurt